The War Machine is a line of miniatures published by Ral Partha in 1982.

Contents
The War Machine is a set of miniatures consisting of an armored battle wagon with a moving catapult, and nine orc figures.

Reception
Steve Jackson reviewed The War Machine in The Space Gamer No. 57. Jackson commented that "it's a lovely piece of work, and the finished catapult is an ornament to my collection. Recommended."

References

See also
List of lines of miniatures

Miniature figures